Escadrille Spa.87 (also known as Escadrille N.87) was a French fighter squadron active during the First World War, from March 1917 to the Armistice. They were credited with 28 confirmed victories over enemy aircraft,

History
Escadrille Spa.87 was founded at Lyon-Bron, France on 8 March 1917 as a Nieuport fighter squadron called Escadrille N.87. It was attached to a French field army, VIII Armee, until 1 July 1918.

The squadron re-equipped with SPAD S.7 and SPAD S.13 fighters on 4 May 1918, and was renamed Escadrille Spa.87. By the Armistice, the fighter squadron had been credited with destroying 28 enemy aircraft.

Commanding officers
 Unknown: 8 March 1917 - 1 January 1918
 Capitaine Pierre Azire: 1 January 1918 - 30 June 1918
 Lieutenant Joseph Jochaud du Plessis: 30 June 1918 - war's end

Notable members
 Adjutant Laurent B. Ruamps
 Adjutant Lucien Gasser

Aircraft
 March 1918 inventory:
 Four Nieuport 24s
 Three Nieuport 27s
 Two SPAD S.7s
 4 May 1918 refitting:
 SPAD S.7
 SPAD S.13

End notes

Reference
 Franks, Norman; Bailey, Frank (1993). Over the Front: The Complete Record of the Fighter Aces and Units of the United States and French Air Services, 1914–1918 London, UK: Grub Street Publishing. .

Fighter squadrons of the French Air and Space Force
Military units and formations established in 1917
Military units and formations disestablished in 1918
Military units and formations of France in World War I
Military aviation units and formations in World War I